Sunhwa-dong is a legal dong, or neighbourhood of the Jung-gu district in Seoul, South Korea and governed by its administrative dong, Sogong-dong and Hoehyeon-dong.

MIAT Mongolian Airlines has its Seoul Branch Office in the Soonhwa Building.

The Korean Maritime Safety Tribunal (KMST) formerly had its headquarters in the S1 Building in the community. Its offices are now in Sejong City.

See also 

Administrative divisions of South Korea

References

External links
 Jung-gu Official site in English
 Jung-gu Official site
 Jung-gu Tour Guide from the Official site
 Status quo of Jung-gu 
 Resident offices and maps of Jung-gu

Neighbourhoods of Jung-gu, Seoul